Minnesota is a state situated in the Midwestern United States. According to the 2020 United States census, Minnesota is the 22nd most populous state with  inhabitants but the 14th largest by land area, spanning  of land. Minnesota is divided into 87 counties and contains 853 incorporated cities, with populations ranging from 425,336 (Minneapolis) to 11 (Kinbrae) in 2021. Minnesota cities are classified by population as a first class city, a second class city, a third class city, or a fourth class city; this is done for legislative purposes.

Cities in Minnesota

See also
 List of census-designated places in Minnesota
 List of counties in Minnesota

Citations

General and cited references 
 U.S. Census Bureau, retrieved February 21, 2010

 
Minnesota
Minnesota geography-related lists